Dmitriy Nikolayevich Abramenkov (born April 24, 1947) is a Russian government official and political figure.

Abramenkov was the vice-governor of the Smolensk Oblast and was a deputy in the State Duma during the second (1995–1999) and third (1999–2003) sessions.

Abramenkov graduated from the Roslavl Technical School for Rail Transport, and the highest party school of Leningrad. He worked as a crane operator and locomotive technician, then as staff leader of the All-Union Komsomol of the Smolensk AES, chairman of the District Committee of People's Control, instructor of the City Committee of the Communist Party of the Soviet Union, and following election to the State Duma, Master of Production Training at the Roslavl Technical School for Rail Transport.

In the State Duma, Abramenkov was associated with the Communist Party of the Russian Federation, serving on the committee for science, and was selected as a candidate for membership in the Central Committee of the Russian Communist Party.

References

1947 births
Living people
Crane operators
Second convocation members of the State Duma (Russian Federation)
Third convocation members of the State Duma (Russian Federation)